Lydiate is a civil parish and a village in Sefton, Merseyside, England.  It contains 14 buildings that are recorded in the National Heritage List for England as designated listed buildings.   Of these, two are listed at Grade II*, the middle of the three grades, and the others are at Grade II, the lowest grade.

The parish is partly residential, containing the village of Lydiate and its later expansion to become effectively a suburb of Maghull, and is otherwise rural.  The Leeds and Liverpool Canal passes through the parish.  The listed buildings include houses and farmhouses with associated structures, churches, a public house, two bridges crossing the canal, a ruined country house, a ruined chapel, and a medieval cross.

Key

Buildings

Notes and references
Notes

Citations

Sources

Listed buildings in Merseyside
Lists of listed buildings in Merseyside
Listed buildings in Lydiate